Évariste Sanchez-Palencia (born 1941 in Madrid), is a French researcher in theoretical mechanics, applied mathematics and epistemology, Emeritus Research Director at the CNRS. He is a member of the French Academy of Sciences since 12 November 2001. He is also a member of the board of the union rationalist.

Distinction and prizes
 1981, CNRS Silver Medal (Physics for Engineers)
 1987, Elected Corresponding Member of the French Academy of Sciences (Division of Mechanical Sciences).
 1995, Award French Institute of Petroleum, awarded by the French Academy of Sciences.
 2001, elected Full Member of the French Academy of Sciences.

Bibliography

In mechanics and mathematics
 Non homogeneous media and vibration theory, "Lecture notes in Physics" 127, Springer, Berlin, 398 pages, 1980; translated in Russian, MIR 1984.”
 with D. Leguillon, Computation of singular solutions in elliptic problems and elasticity, Éditions Masson - John Wiley, Paris - New York, 200 pages, 1987
 with J. Sanchez-Hubert, Vibration and coupling of continuous systems. Asymptotic methods, Springer, Berlin, 421 pages, 1989
 with J. Sanchez-Hubert, Introduction aux méthodes asymptotiques et à l'homogénéisation. Application à la Mécanique des milieux continus, Éditions Masson, Paris (pour la Maîtrise, dirigée par P. G. Paris (1992), 266 pages
 with Sanchez-Hubert, Coques élastiques minces: Propriétés asymptotiques, Éditions Masson, Paris,. (1997), 376 pages.
 with O. Millet and F. Béchet Singular problems in shell theory. Computing and asymptotics, Springer, Berlin, Heidelberg, 265 pages (2010)

In epistemology and history of sciences
 Promenade dialectique dans les sciences, Hermann, 476 pages, 2012., translated in Spanish, Ed.univ.Cantabria 2015 ; translated in Italian, UNICOPLI 2018.
 Several contributions in Science et culture. Repéres pour une culture scientifique commune Edited by J. Haissinski and H. Langevin-Joliot, Apogée/Espace des sciences, Rennes (2015)

Main research topics 
(1970-1985) Homogenization method for continuous media with fine structure.
(1985-2010) Asymptotic study and numerical computation of very thin elastic shells.
(From 2005) epistemology, along the axes:
-Essentially approximate nature and evolution of scientific knowledge.
-Dynamical systems theory provides an intelligible basis to dialectic movement of nature (dynamic interaction, constructive aspects of evolution, etc.)

References
  in l'académie des sciences

Footnotes

Members of the French Academy of Sciences
20th-century  French mathematicians